Michael Gandolfi (born January 31, 1962) is an American actor, producer, and writer. He is best known for playing Andrew on the WB drama series, Gilmore Girls, and as a writer on the sitcom Roseanne.Early life and background
Mike Gandolfi was born on January 31, 1962, in San Diego, California. He is 5' 8" and 150 pounds with brown hair and hazel eyes. His grandfather was a Pearl Harbor survivor and years later, he worked on Operation Wigwam and Operation Redwing, which were nuclear tests conducted by the United States military in the Pacific.

His parents were the first couple married at All Hallows Catholic Church in La Jolla, California. Gandolfi was born a Roman Catholic.

When he was in the 10th grade, his high school put on the musical Guys and Dolls. He played one of the gamblers in Nathan Detroit's clan. Casey Nicholaw, the student who choreographed the show and played Nicely-Nicely Johnson, went on to become a prominent theatre choreographer and stage actor. He was nominated for Tony Awards for choreographing Spamalot, The Drowsy Chaperone, and The Book of Mormon, and won a Tony for co-directing The Book of Mormon.

Mike Gandolfi has a bachelor's degree in comparative literature from San Diego State University. He has taken classes at the Magic Castle in Hollywood. He was accepted to a graduate program to receive a Master of Library and Information Science (MLIS) degree, but decided to take improv classes instead.

While in college one December, he worked as a "seasonal employee" at Toys 'R Us. A co-worker of his claimed to be the basis for Jeff Spicoli in Fast Times at Ridgemont High.

Career
Mike Gandolfi is an Emmy, Peabody, and Golden Globe Award–winning television writer, who has written for the television series, Roseanne, Veronica's Closet, and Dennis Miller Live. While on staff at Roseanne, Gandolfi co-wrote the 100th episode, "The Dark Ages'", which was nominated for a Writers Guild Award. As of 2016, he has two feature films in development, with producers, directors, and talent attached. In addition, he had a recurring role as Andrew throughout most seasons of the Warner Brothers' television series, Gilmore Girls, with a role he will be reprising in the Netflix revival of the series.

He has trained at many improv, comedy, and acting schools including, Upright Citizens Brigade, Groundlings, IO West, Nerdist, Chris Game, Miles Stroth Workshop, Actors Workout Studio, Anthony Meindl's Actor Workshop, Elizabeth Mestnik Acting Studio, and the Magic Castle.

Mike started his career as a stand-up comic, performing in comedy clubs across the country and working with such acclaimed comedians as Jay Leno, Jerry Seinfeld, Roseanne Barr, and Tom Arnold. He has performed stand-up at many places all over the country including improv in Hollywood, San Francisco, and San Diego. He has also performed at The Comedy Store in Hollywood and La Jolla, California, the Great American Music Hall in San Francisco, Zanies in Chicago, The Fillmore in San Francisco, the Comedy Gallery in Minneapolis, and The Comedy Connection in Boston.

He was one of the original writers for the Air America radio network.

While writing for Roseanne, one of the other writers on the series was Amy Sherman-Palladino. She went on to create Gilmore Girls, in which he played a recurring role throughout the series.

He is a member of the Screen Actors Guild, American Federation of Television and Radio Artists, and Writers Guild of America.

 Personal life 
He is married to Stephanie Storey, an actress, writer, producer, cinematographer, director, and editor. She is now the author of her debut novel, Oil and Marble. She is perhaps best known for producing the television series, The Writers' Room. They were married on Leap Day at Disneyland on February 29, 2004. They were engaged at the Dromoland Castle in County Clare, Ireland. They now reside in Sherman Oaks, California.

In 1993, on the episode, First Cousin, Twice Removed, on the series Roseanne, the cousin, played by Joan Collins, was named Ronnie. When the writers were tossing around names for the character, Gandolfi said, "Veronica – Ronnie," which was the one used in the episode. He co-wrote the episode, "The Kiss Is the Thing", for the animated show, Life with Louie. The character voiced by actress, Laurie Metcalf, was named Miss Kinney. Both of these characters were named after real people that Gandolfi personally knew. His great-aunt was named Veronica Kinney. Veronica was his father's mother's sister. She never had children and lived about five blocks from Gandolfi as a child and became very close to him. She encouraged him to be a writer. The year after she died he was hired as a writer for the television series, Veronica's Closet''.

As hobbies he plays taekwondo, ice hockey, and improv comedy. Gandolfi has a Black Belt in taekwondo from Beverly Hills Martial Arts. He has run, and finished, the Los Angeles Marathon twice. He has taken four yoga teacher trainings, but has never actually taught a yoga class.

Filmography

Awards and nominations

References

External links 

 
 

1962 births
Male actors from San Diego
American male film actors
Film producers from California
American male television actors
Television producers from California
Living people
Writers from San Diego
20th-century American male actors
21st-century American male actors
21st-century American writers
San Diego State University alumni